Robert Bush Sebra (December 11, 1961 – July 22, 2020) was an American professional baseball pitcher, who played in Major League Baseball (MLB) for the Texas Rangers, Montreal Expos, Philadelphia Phillies, Cincinnati Reds, and Milwaukee Brewers, in all or part of the  to  seasons. He threw and batted right-handed.

Career
Sebra attended the University of Nebraska–Lincoln, and in 1981 he played collegiate summer baseball with the Wareham Gatemen of the Cape Cod Baseball League. He was drafted by the Texas Rangers in the 5th round of the 1983 Major League Baseball draft.

Over the course of his big league career, he pitched in 94 games, 52 of them as a starting pitcher. Included among Sebra’s MLB highlights are 2 shutouts, a 1-0 and a 2-0, accomplished while with Montreal.

In 1986, Sebra was the last pitcher ever to give up a walk-off win where the winning run was scored by the other team's manager.

Sebra was primarily a starting pitcher but on July 28, 1989, he picked up his lone career save. He pitched a scoreless 17th inning to close out a 4-2 Reds victory over the Braves. He was traded along with Ron Robinson from the Reds to the Brewers for Glenn Braggs and Billy Bates on June 9, 1990.

Personal life
Born in Ridgewood, New Jersey, Sebra played prep baseball at Gloucester Catholic High School. Sebra died at the age of 58 on July 22, 2020, after spending a year in intensive care in Jackson Memorial Hospital in Miami, Florida, as a result of multiple organ failure. He had undergone a liver transplant several years earlier.

References

External links

1961 births
2020 deaths
American expatriate baseball players in Canada
Baseball players from New Jersey
Cincinnati Reds players
Deaths from multiple organ failure
Denver Zephyrs players
Gloucester Catholic High School alumni
Indianapolis Indians players
Iowa Cubs players
Jackson Generals (Texas League) players
Liver transplant recipients
Louisville Redbirds players
Major League Baseball pitchers
Milwaukee Brewers players
Montreal Expos players
Nashville Sounds players
Nebraska Cornhuskers baseball players
Oklahoma City 89ers players
Osceola Astros players
People from Ridgewood, New Jersey
Philadelphia Phillies players
Scranton/Wilkes-Barre Red Barons players
Somerset Patriots players
Sportspeople from Bergen County, New Jersey
Texas Rangers players
Tri-Cities Triplets players
Tucson Toros players
Tulsa Drillers players
Wareham Gatemen players
Alaska Goldpanners of Fairbanks players